Davis College may refer more than one higher education institution:

Davis College (New York)
Davis College (Ohio)
 Davis College (Mallow), County Cork, Ireland

See also 
Davis Technology College, Kaysville, Utah